The Evergreen Heritage Center is a historic museum property on Trimble Road, east of Mount Savage, Maryland.  The property, dubbed Evergreen relatively early in its history, has a history dating to the mid-18th century, and its buildings represent a distinct cross-section of styles across a period of more than 200 years.  The oldest surviving element is the c. 1780 barn; the main house includes a stone portion built c. 1822–23, with its main section, built on an 18th-century foundation, exhibiting fine Late Victorian architecture.  The property also includes early 20th-century industrial resources, associated with a coal tramway.

The property was listed on the National Register of Historic Places in 2015.

See also
National Register of Historic Places listings in Allegany County, Maryland

References

External links
Evergreen Heritage Center web site

Industrial buildings and structures on the National Register of Historic Places in Maryland
Buildings and structures in Cumberland, Maryland
Museums in Allegany County, Maryland
National Register of Historic Places in Allegany County, Maryland
1780 establishments in Maryland
Buildings and structures completed in 1780
Coal mining in the United States